Afterwards is a 2017 Canadian drama film starring Laurent Lucas, written and directed by Noël Mitrani. This film tells a psychotherapeutic experience allowing to put an end to a state of post-traumatic stress disorder.

Plot 
A man blames himself for the tragic death of his daughter's friend. Unable to get past this event, the man spirals into depression, and then he undergoes a groundbreaking therapeutic treatment that may put him in contact with dead people.

Cast 
 Laurent Lucas ... as Marc
 Laurence Dauphinais ... as Florence
 Natacha Mitrani... as Marion
 Mohsen El Gharbi... as The psychologist
 Pascale Bussières... as Aurélie's mother
 Richard Fréchette... The motorist 
 Véronique Mitrani... An applicant for employment 
 William Akis... An applicant for employment 
 Valérie Leclair... The psychiatrist

References

External links 
 

2017 films
2010s French-language films
Canadian drama films
Films set in Montreal
Films directed by Noël Mitrani
2017 drama films
French-language Canadian films
2010s Canadian films